The AFL North Coast is an Australian rules football competition in the Mid North Coast region of New South Wales. Founded in 1982 as The North Coast Australian Football League it merged with the junior league in its area in 2008 and was renamed AFL North Coast.

History

The very beginning
A meeting to form an Australian Football club in Coffs Harbour was held in the Coffs Hotel on 6 December 1976. The meeting to form the Coffs Harbour club was attended by 12 enthusiastic people – all of whom were elected to the committee. Fred Miller, who had led the charge to establish the code in the district, was elected as President. The first Secretary-Treasurer was Brian Saville.
The club did not have enough players for a team, nor a coach, nor a ground to play on yet they commenced training at 5pm on Tuesdays in December at the St Augustine’s school oval such was their enthusiasm for the game. The new club chose to adopt the colours of North Melbourne Football Club, at that time enjoying great success in the then VFL, while the Dehnert brothers, Noel and Phil volunteered to provide timber saplings for the goal posts.

Early Days
The first-ever Australian football match played in Coffs Harbour was in 1977 between a University of New England team and Coffs Harbour 12 March at the Coffs Harbour Racecourse – the university side won the match 13.12 (80) to 4.13 (37). The Coffs Coast Advocate reported that the match attracted about 50 spectators and "despite the heavy conditions was enjoyed by everyone there".
Some club scratch matches were played that year but the match at Coffs Harbour racecourse was the only official match played in Coffs in 1977.
A North Coast team made of players from Coffs Harbour and Port Macquarie played in the Northern NSW Country Championships at Gunnedah in May 1977 but lost both matches to New England and a North-West team. It was decided at these championships to play the 1978 series at Coffs Harbour to promote the game on the North Coast.

Playing in New England
The Coffs Harbour club joined the New England AFL for the 1978 season. The competition had four teams based around the New England university and Uralla who had also entered the New England competition that year. There were two major challenges for the Coffs Harbour club now that it had a competition to play in. The first hurdle to overcome was to secure a ground to train and play on. The second issue was to travel for away games across to Armidale almost 180 kilometres away via Dorrigo Mountain with a large unsealed section of road at Ebor. The club was very fortunate to have Mike Cain as a committee member as he was working at the time as a town planner with the Coffs Harbour Shire Council. It was largely through his efforts that the club secured England's Park as a home ground.
Coffs Harbour enjoyed almost immediate success in this league finishing third in its initial season in the New England league then taking out the premiership in 1979.

Two teams in Coffs Harbour
Even in its infancy the Coffs club administrators knew that the future for Australian Rules on the Coffs Coast was on the coast.
Therefore, it entered two teams in the New England AFL in 1980 – Souths and Norths, but under the one administration with a view to eventually forming a North Coast league.
Brian Saville said in the Coffs Coast Advocate on 5 October 1979: "Having a strong side for a long time will not benefit the sport in this area". He added that the aim of the Coffs Harbour club was to have its own North Coast League.
As the original Coffs club had worn blue and white vertical stripes the same as VFL club North Melbourne (Kangaroos) it was agreed to call one team "Norths" and the other "Souths" based on the-then VFL club South Melbourne (now the Sydney Swans) and have it wear white with a red V.
The first ever local derby between the North Coffs and South Coffs was played in 1980 on 18 May "in fine spirit before a large, enthusiastic crowd at England’s Park". The final score saw North Coffs 10.5 (65) defeat South Coffs 9.10 (64).
North Coffs defeated Armidale City 13.8 (86) to 4.5 (29) for the 1980 New England AFL premiership after the Armidale team defeated South Coffs in the preliminary final. The next year North Coffs and South Coffs met in the 1981 grand final which South Coffs won.

1982 – North Coast league begins
The New England AFL had provided a competition for the Coffs Harbour teams but it was time to move on and develop a coastal league. With the formation of the North Coast AFL in 1982 the two Coffs Harbour teams became clubs in their own right. The other clubs to form the North Coast Australian Football League were Grafton, Urunga, Woolgoolga and Port Macquarie. The Port club had been formed in 1981 and played its first season in the New England AFL. The inaugural President was Brian Saville, who had been instrumental in the establishment of the game in Coffs Harbour. Woolgoolga won the first of its nine premierships in the North Coast AFL when it beat Port Macquarie in the first-ever grand final.

In 1985 Port Macquarie left to form a new league to the south of the town. They help form the Mid North AFL with Forster (from the Newcastle FL) and 3 new teams that formed in Taree, Kempsey and Walchope. This league lasted until 1992 before folding. Port Macquarie and Taree and Kempsey then joined the NCAFL.

Meanwhile Woolgoolga was the team to beat, early trendsetters they managed to play in the first thirteen grand finals for the league winning seven of them.

Grafton decided in 1996 to play in the Summerland AFL and wouldn't return for 6 seasons.

The 2000s, merger and renaming of league

Taree folded in 2002, the same year that Grafton returned to the competition. 

After nine premierships the Woolgoolga Club ran out of steam and went into recess after the 2005 season.

Up until 2008 the North Coast Junior and Senior Competitions had operated as separate legal entities. In late 2008 the two competitions merged to form AFL North Coast. In 2014 AFL North Coast further merged with the Mid North Coast Juniors that had comprised clubs from Port Macquarie, Camden Haven, Macleay Valley, and Wauchope. For the first time AFL on the North Coast was serviced by one entity covering both Seniors and Juniors, stretching from Taree to Yamba.

The two Coffs Harbour base clubs merged and formed the Coffs Harbour Breakers in 2015.

In 2017 the Board of AFL North Coast determined to name the Senior Best and Fairest award the Brian Saville Medal in recognition of the enormous contribution Brian had made to the early years of the code in the region. Luke Matthews won his second Best and Fairest award to be the first recipient of the Brain Saville Medal.

That same year AFL North Coast made its first foray into female footy with the introduction of a four team Youth Girls (Under 17) competition. Earlier that year former Sawtell/Toormina local junior Nikki Wallace had become the first North Coast player to be play at AFL level, and the Youth Girls Best and Fairest award was named the Nikki Wallace Medal. Cassidy Ronalds was the first winner of the medal.

In 2018 an open age Women's competition commenced with teams from the Port Macquarie Magpies, Sawtell/Toormina Saints, and Coffs Breakers competing. Also in 2018 the Under 18 age group changed to become Under 17 to better align with the junior pathway.

2019 and 2020 saw a period of significant local growth, with the Northern Beaches Blues club forming in Woolgoolga in 2019, followed by the Nambucca Valley Lions in 2020. In each case the club fielded a Reserve Grade team in its first season and went on to win the competition at the first attempt. Northern Beaches Blues had a joint venture Women's team with the Grafton Tigers in 2019 which then became a stand alone Northern Beaches team the following season.

Further expansion was achieved in 2021, with Lismore Swans moving south from the former AFL Northern Rivers League, together with the Casino Lions that reformed after many years in recess. These latest additions, together with both Northern Beaches Blues and Nambucca Valley Lions stepping up to the Senior Grade saw the competition operate with eight Senior men's teams and six Women's teams. Unfortunately, the state-wide lockdown enacted by the state government on 14 August meant that the season had to be abandoned after the first week of Finals, with the Minor Premiers acknowledged in each grade.

The damage to the town of Lismore caused by the floods in early 2022, has caused hardship for the football club to play in 2022. The club was forced to take the position that football was not the priority for the townsfolk so they withdrew all teams for the season.

At the end of 2022 the Byron Magpies voted to join the league.

Clubs

2023 roster

Seniors – Previous

Junior clubs

Umpires Association
North Coast Australian Football League Umpires Association Official Site

Premierships

List of AFL North Coast Senior grand finals

The grand finals of 1982–1986 were played at Englands Park, Coffs Harbour.

The grand finals of 1987–1988 were played at Centennial Oval, Woolgoolga.

The grand finals of 1989–1993 were played at Fitzroy Oval, Coffs Harbour.

Every grand final since 1994 has been played at the International Stadium, Coffs Harbour.

In the uncompleted 2021 season, Coffs Harbour Breakers were acknowledged as winners of the Minor Premiership.

List of AFL North Coast Women's grand finals

In the uncompleted 2021 season, Coffs Harbour Breakers were acknowledged as winners of the Minor Premiership.

General statistics

Woodlock Medal
In 2004 a medal was struck to honour the many years of service Jim and Jill Woodlock each gave to the league as administrators and Life Members. The Woodlock Medal is awarded to the player judged as the best on ground in a senior grand final.
The first year the medal was awarded, North Coffs midfielder Greg Jarman edged out teammate Brad Giri for the award.
Teenager Jack Gillingham became the first player to be awarded two Woodlock Medals when he won the coveted award in 2009 and 2010 when Sawtell-Toormina comfortably won the grand final.
In the history of the award, no player from a losing grand final team has been the recipient.

League Best & Fairest
The League Best & Fairest is given for the best and fairest player in the AFL North Coast during the home and away season, similar to the AFL's Brownlow Medal. The players who have won the most League Best & Fairest awards are former Sawtell-Toormina ruckman Brian Rava in 1991, 1992 and 1998, fellow Saint Mark Couzens who claimed the prize in 2007, 2009 and 2014, Port Macquarie forward Jesse Schmidt in 2012, 2013 and 2015 and Fraser Duryea in 2016, 2021 and 2022. Jeff Reed, Troy Mirkin, Brad Giri and Luke Matthews have all won the award twice. Mirkin and Duryea are the only players to win the award at two different clubs. The list of League Best & Fairest winners follows:

Grand Final Best on Ground – Women
The Women's Best on Ground in the Grand Final was introduced in the inaugural season of the competition. The list of Best on Ground winners follows:

Prior to the introduction of the Women's Competition a series of demonstration matches were played during the 2017 season. From these six matches a Players' Player Award was presented based on votes collated from each player in each match. The winner of the 2017 Players' Player Award was Maggie Mills.

League Best & Fairest – Women
A Women's Best and Fairest award was introduced in 2018 to coincide with the introduction of a Women's competition. Just like the awards for their male counterparts, the award is voted on by the Umpires during the home and away season on a 3, 2, 1 basis. The list of League Best & Fairest winners follows:

Teams of the decade
On the same night AFL North Coast held the 2010 league best & fairest count, it also announced a Team of the Decade for 2000–2009. To be eligible for selection a player needed to have played in at least three of the 10 years that were being judged. 

On Sunday 15 March 2020 AFL North Coast announced its second Team of the Decade covering the period 2010 to 2019. Selection criteria for this team was retained from the original process.

Female Pioneers
In conjunction with the announcement of the Team of the Decade (2010 to 2019) AFL North Coast also celebrated those that were the champions of the commencement of Women's footy in the region. The Female Pioneers are those players that were involved in the demonstration matches in 2017 before the competition was born, who then went on to play club footy in 2018 and/or 2019.

Legends of Local Footy
In 2021, AFL North Coast celebrated its 40th season of the local League since its formation in 1982. At a function on 17 April, 38 individuals were named as "Legends of Local Footy" by their clubs for their contribution throughout the 40 years of the League's history.

See also
AFL NSW/ACT
Australian rules football in New South Wales

External links
 

Australian rules football competitions in New South Wales
Coffs Harbour